The symbol ↑, an upward pointing arrow, also called up arrow, uparrow, or upwards arrow, may refer to:

Notation
 ↑, a mathematical symbol for "undefined"
 ↑, a notation of Knuth's up-arrow notation for very large integers
 ↑, a mathematical game theory position Up
 ↑ or Sheffer stroke, the logical connective "not both" or NAND
 ↑, the APL function 'take'
 "Increased" (and similar meanings), in medical notation
 ↑, a chemical symbol for production of gas, which bubbles up.

Character representations
 ↑, upwards arrow, a Unicode arrow symbol
 ↑, &uarr;, a HTML or XML character entity
 ↑, codepoint 8A (hex) in EBCDIC Code page 293, used for writing APL
 ↑, the glyph for character 94 (decimal) in ASCII until 1967, when it was replaced by the caret (^).

See also
 Ꙟ, an archaic Romanian Cyrillic letter
 Arrow keys, on computer keyboards
 Arrow (disambiguation)
 ↓ (disambiguation)
 → (disambiguation)
 ← (disambiguation)
 Up (disambiguation)